Chah Gani (also Romanized as Chāh Ganī; also known as Chāganī, Chāganu, Chāgūnī, Chāh-e Gūnū, Chah Gooni, Chāh Gūnī, Chāh Gūnow, Chāh Gūnū, and Chākūni) is a village in Kuhestan Rural District, Rostaq District, Darab County, Fars Province, Iran. At the 2006 census, its population was 183, in 39 families.

References 

Populated places in Darab County